The Széchenyi Academy of Literature and Arts was created in 1992 as an academy associated yet independent from the Hungarian Academy of Sciences. It is intended to be the national academy of artists and writers, who could be elected to the HAS until the 1949 reforms. The president is Károly Makk, film director.  Earlier it was László Dobszay (resigned on April 20, 2011).

Notable members
Gyula Csapó composer
 László Dobszay music historian
 Miklós Jancsó, film director
Zoltán Jeney composer
 Ferenc Juhász, poet
 Károly Klimó, painter, graphic
 Zoltán Kocsis pianist-conductor
 György Konrád, writer
 György Kurtág, composer
 Dora Maurer, visual artist
 Péter Nádas writer
 György Spiró, writer
 István Szabó film director
 Magda Szabó, writer
László Vidovszky composer

See also
 Hungarian Academy of Arts (Magyar Művészeti Akadémia)

References

External links
 homepage of the  Széchenyi Academy

 
Hungarian Academy of Sciences
National academies of arts and humanities